The National Pollen and Aerobiology Research Unit or NPARU is a research institute in Worcester. It produces the UK's pollen count, and was the world's first pollen forecasting service.

History
Aerobiology is the study of organic particles and organisms in the atmosphere. The National Pollen and Hayfever Bureau was founded in Rotherham on 21 April 1983. Forecasts for Britain's six million people with  hay fever (allergic rhinitis) began from 1 June 1983; it was funded by Fisons Pharmaceuticals. Most people with hay fever are aged 15–24 in the months of June and July. Treatments are Beconase (beclometasone dipropionate) and Flixonase (fluticasone propionate). In May 1984 it was about to close when funding by Fisons was withdrawn; the centre continued with funding from kleenex
The first amateur pollen trap is now lodged in The National Science Museum
The original network was mainly serviced by 30 local authorities on a voluntary basis.

Clarityline, a 24-hour helpline for the pollen count began in April 1994.

It became the National Pollen Research Unit, and moved to Worcester. The new building was officially opened on 2 December 2009 by Prince Richard, Duke of Gloucester.

Function
Its pollen forecasts are produced in collaboration with the Met Office.

Structure
It is housed in the Charles Darwin Building, designed by the Building Design Partnership. It was built in 2009 at a cost of £7m. It is situated in the west of Worcester, off the A443 and north of the Three Choirs Way.

See also
 Asthma UK 
 Royal National Throat, Nose and Ear Hospital

References

External links
 Met Office pollen forecast

Allergy organizations
Biological research institutes in the United Kingdom
Health in Worcestershire
Microbiology institutes
Natural Environment Research Council
Research institutes established in 1983
Research institutes in Worcestershire